Yuyao is a county-level city in the northeast of Zhejiang province, China. It is under the jurisdiction of the sub-provincial city of Ningbo.

Demographics
As of the 2020 census, its population was 1,254,032. Its built-up (or metro) area with the county-level city of Cixi largely conurbated, had 3,083,520 inhabitants. However, recently the migrated workers and their families have increase the total population to about 1.6 million, but they do not show up in the official census and other related statistics data.

Geography and climate
Yuyao lies in a subtropical monsoon zone, rich in sunshine and rain fall, warm and humid, distinct in the four seasons. The mean annual sunshine is 2,061 hours and the annual rate of sunshine is 47%.  The mean annual temperature is 16 degree Celsius and the coldest months perennially are January and February, the hottest are July and August. The mean annual precipitation is around 1,300 millimeters and changes greatly from year to year. The hyetal distribution is also uneven during a year, and the rainfall centers on East Asian rainy season (梅雨) (aka bai-u rainy period) from April to June and typhoon period from July to December.

Yuyao offers a wide variety of landscape from wide open ocean in Hangzhou Bay, rice fields in fertile plains to high spires in Siming Mountains. Yaojiang River originates in Siming Mountains in the south where the Ninth Fantasy world of Taoism is located. Yaojiang River goes through the county and extends eastward into East China Sea as well as Pacific Ocean.

In 2021, Typhoon In-fa caused 951.0 mm of rainfall to fall in Yuyao.

History
Yuyao is well known for its rich heritage of civilization. The Neolithic Hemudu culture formed in Yuyao about 5,000 B.C. is one of the earliest sites of human civilization on earth. The material and ethical relics revealed large-scale rice plantation and other agricultural activities, hurdle style architecture, paddling and boating and respecting birds and sun.

Yuyao also produced many famous scholars in the history, for example, Yan Zi-Ling in Han Dynasty, Yu Fan in Three Kingdoms Period, Yu Xi in Jin Dynasty, Yu Shinan in Sui Dynasty and Tang Dynasty, Wang Yangming, Zhu Shunshui and Huang Zongxi in Ming Dynasty. Wang Yangming and Huang Zongxi were ranked among China's top 10 ideologists. Yuyao was then named as “the Most Famous County”and “the Famous State on Literature”. During the Anti-Japanese War, Yuyao was one of China's 19 bases against Japanese invaders, and was the center of anti-Japanese bases of eastern Zhejiang province.

Administrative divisions
Subdistricts:
Lanjiang Subdistrict (兰江街道), Ditang Subdistrict (低塘街道), Fengshan Subdistrict (凤山街道), Langxia Subdistrict (朗霞街道), Lizhou Subdistrict (梨洲街道), Yangming Subdistrict (阳明街道)

Towns:
Dalan (大岚镇), Dayin (大隐镇), Huangjiabu (黄家埠镇), Hemudu (河姆渡镇), Lubu (陆埠镇), Liangnong (梁弄镇), Linshan (临山镇), Mushan (牟山镇), Mazhu (马渚镇), Simingshan (四明山镇), SImen (泗门镇), Sanqishi (三七市镇), Xiaocao'e (小曹娥镇), Zhangting (丈亭镇)

The only township is Luting Township (鹿亭乡)

Economy
Yuyao is known as a place for rice and fish. Its economy has been booming as private enterprises dominate after the economic reform began in late 1970s. In 2007, GDP will reach RMB 34 billions, with double digit annual growth rates over the past 20 years. It ranked as one of the top-20 counties in terms of comprehensive economic strength out of all the 2100 counties in China. The industry products are mainly electric appliances, plastic moulding,  machinery and textiles. High-tech industries such as materials, optical, electro-mechanical integration and fine chemical industry are developing rapidly. The main agriculture, forestry and animal husbandry products of Yuyao are tea, fruits like waxberry and mandarin orange, bamboo, silkworm, fowl, livestock and fish. Fresh produce is available in all seasons.

Transport
The Shanghai-Hangzhou-Ningbo Expressway and China National Highway 329 and Shanghai-Hangzhou-Ningbo Railway go through Yuyao. The world's longest trans-oceanic bridge - the  Hangzhou Bay Bridge - was recently completed construction near the northern border of Yuyao. It reduced the cross bay traffic to only  from the current  section of Shanghai-Hangzhou-Ningbo Expressway around Hangzhou Bay.

References

External links 
 Official Web Portal of Yuyao - English

 
Geography of Ningbo
County-level cities in Zhejiang